Kerrin Margaret Vautier is a New Zealand economist. She is the deputy chair of the Reserve Bank of New Zealand.

Biography 
Vautier was a lecturer in competition law at the University of Auckland, until she was appointed as a monetary policy advisor at the Reserve Bank in 2002.

She has held a number of governance positions in international affairs. She was a foundation member of the board of the Asia 2000 Foundation of New Zealand until 2001, and has also served as chair of the New Zealand Committee of the Pacific Economic Cooperation Council. In 2002, she was appointed chair of the advisory board of the New Zealand Asia Institute.

Personal life 
Vautier was a violinist in the National Youth Orchestra of New Zealand for five years.

Publications 

 Vautier, K. M. (1998). Competition principles for APEC economies. New Zealand: APEC Study Centre, New Zealand Asia Institute.
Vautier, K. M., Farmer, J. A., & Baxt, R. (1990). CER and business competition: Australia and New Zealand in a global economy. Auckland: Commerce Clearing House N.Z. Ltd.

References

Academic staff of the University of Auckland
New Zealand economists
New Zealand non-fiction writers
Year of birth missing (living people)
Living people